Class 29 may refer to:

 British Rail Class 29
 KTM Class 29